The Winter Hill Gang is a loose confederation of organized crime figures in the Boston, Massachusetts, area. The gang members and leadership are predominantly Irish-American with many members of Italian-American descent. 

The organization itself derives its name from the Winter Hill neighborhood of Somerville, Massachusetts, north of Boston. Amongst its members several have been notorious Boston gangsters, such as Buddy McLean, Whitey Bulger, Howie Winter, Joseph McDonald, Johnny Martorano, Patrick Nee and Stephen Flemmi. They were most influential from 1965, under the rule of McLean and Winter, to the 1979 takeover led by Bulger.

The Winter Hill Gang was given its name in the 1970s by journalists at the Boston Herald, but the name is hardly ever openly used as a reference to them. Winter Hill Gang members are alleged to have been involved with most typical organized-crime-related activities, but they are perhaps most well-known for fixing horse races in the northeastern United States and shipping weapons to the IRA. Twenty-one members and associates, including Winter, were indicted by federal prosecutors in 1979.

Irish Gang War 
The Boston Irish Gang War started in 1961 and lasted until 1967. It was fought between the McLaughlin Gang of the Boston neighborhood of Charlestown, led by Bernie McLaughlin, and the Winter Hill Gang of Somerville, led by James "Buddy" McLean.

The two gangs had co-existed in relative peace for a number of years until an incident at Salisbury Beach on Labor Day weekend 1961. While at a party, Georgie McLaughlin made an advance on the girlfriend of Winter Hill Gang member Alexander Petricone, Jr. (who fled the Boston area during the war and became an actor under the name Alex Rocco). McLaughlin was subsequently beaten unconscious by members of the Winter Hill Gang and was dumped outside the local hospital. Bernie McLaughlin went to see "Buddy" McLean and demanded that he hand over the members of the gang who beat his brother. McLean refused. The McLaughlins took this refusal as an insult and attempted to wire a bomb to McLean's wife's car. In retaliation, McLean shot and killed McLaughlin coming out of the "Morning Glory" bar in Charlestown in October 1961. This was the start of Boston's Irish Gang War.

In 1965, McLean was shot and killed by one of the last survivors of the McLaughlin Gang, Steve Hughes. Howie Winter then assumed control of the Winter Hill Gang. One of the surviving McLaughlin brothers, nicknamed "Punchy", was shot while waiting for a bus in the West Roxbury section of Boston. A year later, in 1966, the last two associates of the McLaughlin Gang, brothers Connie and Steve Hughes were killed, allegedly by hitman Frank Salemme. By the time the war finally ended, more than 60 men had been murdered throughout Boston and the surrounding area.

After the Irish Gang war, the Winter Hill Gang was reputed to be not only the top Irish Mob syndicate in the New England area, but New York City, as well. In the book Black Mass by Dick Lehr and Gerard O'Neill, the authors make the unsubstantiated claim that the Winter Hill Gang was far more feared and powerful than their rivals, the Boston branch of the Patriarca crime family run by the Angiulo Brothers.

Historical leadership

Leaders
 1955–1965: James "Buddy" McLean: Boss, killed 1965.
 1965–1978: Howard "Howie" Winter: Boss, jailed in 1978, released in 2002, died in 2020
 1978–1995: James "Whitey" Bulger: Boss, one of the most infamous Irish Mob bosses. Fled Boston in 1994 due to a pending federal indictment. He was on the FBI's Ten Most Wanted list until his arrest in Santa Monica, California on June 22, 2011. He had a $2 million bounty on his head. Killed in his cell at age 89 at USP Hazleton on October 30, 2018.
 1995–2000: Kevin Weeks: Boss, was Bulger's lieutenant, he was arrested on November 17, 1999 and became a cooperating witness in January 2000; released from federal prison on February 4, 2005, he wrote a book in 2006 entitled Brutal: The Untold Story of My Life Inside Whitey Bulger's Irish Mob

Notable associates
 Stephen Flemmi: Whitey Bulger's partner who was arrested in 1994, currently serving a life sentence 
 Johnny Martorano: Notorious contract killer and charter member of the gang, involved in 20 mob related killings, served 12 years in prison for murder
 Patrick Nee: An associate of Bulger and Weeks and  gunrunner; released from prison in 2000 and wrote the book A Criminal and an Irishman in 2006

Criminal activities

During the 1970s, the gang's most prominent members were Howie Winter, John Martorano, James J. Bulger, Stephen Flemmi,  Joseph McDonald and James Sims. The Winter Hill Gang was quite proficient at murdering rival mobsters in order to take over their rackets. But once they gained control, they had no idea how to run them. They learned the lesson of their gang's disastrous foray into gambling after wiping out Joseph (Indian Joe) Notarangeli's crew. In what should have been a fabulously profitable illicit gambling enterprise, the gang lost it. As the years went by, James Bulger and Stephen Flemmi lost interest in running any kind of gambling operation. They would eventually only provide protection for bookmakers, drug dealers and truck hijackers. By 1975, Howie Winter and John Martorano were going broke. Eventually they had to go to Patriarca family underboss Gennaro Angiulo to borrow money. To make the weekly payments, they began going into businesses with people they didn't know and couldn't trust. These activities included rigging horse races and drug trafficking.

It was the decision to involve outsiders with their business that led to their downfall. By 1979, Howie Winter and the rest of the Somerville crew were all sent to prison for fixing horse races, leaving Whitey Bulger and Stephen Flemmi as the new leaders of the Winter Hill Gang.  During the 1980s, Bulger's associates consisted of Kevin Weeks, Kevin O'Neil, and Patrick Nee. By 1991, even as James J. Bulger's criminal career was winding down, he remained the undisputed mob boss. His criminal associate Kevin Weeks was not considered a threat, and neither were Jim Mulvey, even though he suspected Bulger of being an FBI informant, Billy Shea, John Shea, Tim Connolly, Pat Linskey, Eddie MacKenzie, Paul "Polecat" Moore or John Cherry. Boston journalist Howie Carr commented, "They hadn't really been gangsters so much as they'd been ex-boxers and bar-room brawlers who had become cocaine dealers." One problem that arose with the gang was that they enjoyed partaking in their own vices. Like their customers, they spent afternoons in the fall drinking beer and watching professional football on television, often doubling up wagers on late West Coast games as they desperately tried to break even and chased their losses. Despite the above unsubstantiated claims of the gang's apparent inability to successfully run organized crime rackets, Bulger generated well over $25 million in racketeering proceeds alone throughout his criminal career, according to paperwork filed in federal court.

The Winter Hill Gang played a role in the Irish Republican Army's paramilitary actions in the late 20th century. In his novel, A Criminal and an Irishman, Patrick Nee detailed the gang's involvement with the IRA. He said that Bulger "loved being associated with the IRA and the cause of Irish Freedom". He went on to say that Bulger's association with the IRA gave him a sense of legitimacy. Nee played an active role in raising funds and smuggling weapons to the IRA. In September of 1984, the Valhalla, a fishing boat, left Boston harbor loaded with weapons.  The vessel was seized by two Irish Naval Service ships upon arriving in Ireland having been sold out by an Irish informant. The Winter Hill Gang also had a plot spoiled by a local fisherman John McIntyre who they had partnered with but who went to the police after hearing word of a gun-running mission. The authorities attempted to use McIntyre as an informant against Whitey Bulger. However, Whitey Bulger received information from FBI agent John Connolly that the fisherman had gone to the police. Connolly provided McIntyre's whereabouts and Whitey Bulger along with his right-hand man Stephen Flemmi tortured and killed him.

FBI informants
In 1998, during a trial for racketeering and fixing horse races, Steve Flemmi and Whitey Bulger were revealed under disclosure to be FBI informants. Steve Flemmi and Whitey Bulger were implicated in many unlawful activities, including murder, but were never brought to justice due to their FBI handlers diverting their guilt onto others in the gang or various other gangs of the time. They were first handled by Special Agent H. Paul Rico and then later by SA John "Zip" Connolly. In addition to providing details on other gangs, Flemmi and Bulger relayed information on fellow members of the Winter Hill Gang to the FBI. When they had nothing to report, they would make up information to ensure that they were seen to be of high value to the agency.

See also
 Black Mass
 Brotherhood
 Whitey Bulger
 Charlestown Mob
 John Connolly
 The Departed
 Irish Mob
 Mullen Gang

References

External links
 Reporting on "Whitey" Bulger and the Winter Hill GangThe Boston Globe
 The Search for 'Whitey' Bulger (story series). The Boston Globe
 

 
Irish-American organized crime groups
Gangs in Massachusetts